Aq Burhan is a village in northern Aleppo Governorate, northwestern Syria.

Administratively the village belongs to Nahiya Akhtarin in Azaz District. Nearby localities include Qar Kalbin  to the east. In the 2004 census, Aq Burhan had a population of 627.

References

Villages in Aleppo Governorate
Populated places in Azaz District